Quiz Show is a 1994 American historical mystery-drama film directed and produced by Robert Redford. Dramatizing the Twenty-One quiz show scandals of the 1950s, the screenplay by Paul Attanasio adapts the memoirs of Richard N. Goodwin, a U.S. Congressional lawyer who investigated the accusations of game-fixing by show producers. The film chronicles the rise and fall of popular contestant Charles Van Doren after the fixed loss of Herb Stempel and Goodwin's subsequent probe.

The film stars John Turturro as Stempel, Rob Morrow as Goodwin, and Ralph Fiennes as Charles Van Doren. Paul Scofield, David Paymer, Hank Azaria, Martin Scorsese, Mira Sorvino, and Christopher McDonald play supporting roles. The real Goodwin and Stempel served as technical advisors to the production.

The film received generally positive reviews and was nominated for several awards, including a Best Picture Oscar nomination and several Golden Globe Awards.

Plot 
In 1958, the questions and answers to be used for the latest broadcast of NBC's popular quiz show Twenty-One are transported from a secure bank vault to the studio. The evening's main attraction is Queens resident Herb Stempel, the reigning champion, who correctly answers question after question. Eventually, both the network and the program's corporate sponsor, the supplementary tonic Geritol, begin to fear that Stempel's approval ratings are beginning to level out, and decide that the show would benefit from new talent.

Producers Dan Enright and Albert Freedman are surprised when Columbia University instructor Charles Van Doren, son of a prominent literary family, visits their office to audition for a different, less difficult show by the same producers, Tic-Tac-Dough. Realizing that they have found an ideal challenger for Stempel, they offer to ask the same questions during the show which Van Doren correctly answered during his audition. He refuses, but when he comes within reach of a game-winning 21 points on the show, he is asked one of the questions from his audition. After a moment of moral indecision, he gives the correct answer. Stempel deliberately misses an easy question and loses, having been promised a future in television if he does so.

In the weeks that follow, Van Doren's winning streak makes him a national celebrity, but he reluctantly buckles under the pressure and allows Enright and Freedman to start giving him the answers. Meanwhile, Stempel, having lost his prize money to an unscrupulous bookie, begins threatening legal action against NBC after weeks go by without his return to television. He visits New York County District Attorney Frank Hogan, who convenes a grand jury to look into his allegations.

Richard Goodwin, a young Congressional lawyer, learns that the grand jury findings have been sealed and travels to New York City to investigate rumors of rigged quiz shows. Visiting a number of contestants, including Stempel and Van Doren, he begins to suspect that Twenty-One is a fixed operation. Stempel's volatile personality damages his credibility, and nobody else seems willing to confirm that the show is fixed. Fearing Goodwin will give up the investigation, Stempel confesses that he was fed the correct answers during his run on the show, and insists that Van Doren must have been involved as well. Another former contestant gives Goodwin a set of answers that he mailed to himself two days before his quiz show appearance, which Goodwin takes to be corroborating evidence.

A guilt-ridden Van Doren deliberately loses, but NBC offers him a lucrative contract to appear as a special correspondent on the morning Today show. The House Committee for Legislative Oversight convenes a hearing, at which Goodwin presents his evidence of the quiz show's corruption. Stempel testifies at the hearing but fails to convince the committee, and both NBC network head Robert Kintner and Geritol executive Martin Rittenhome deny any knowledge of Twenty-One being rigged. Subpoenaed by Goodwin, Van Doren testifies before the committee and admits his role in the deception. After the hearing adjourns, he learns from reporters that he has been fired from Today and that Columbia's board of trustees is going to ask for his resignation.

Goodwin believes that he is on the verge of a victory against Geritol and NBC, but realizes that Enright and Freedman will not jeopardize their own futures in television by turning against their bosses. He silently watches the producers' testimony, vindicating the sponsors and the network from any wrongdoing, and taking full responsibility for rigging the show. Disgusted, he steps outside and sees Van Doren, who waves at him before boarding a taxi.

Cast

Historical accuracy 
Although a majority of Quiz Show is accurate to the real-life events its based on, it had enough artistic licenses to stir up controversy and criticism (especially towards character changes) by critics and real-life figures of the scandal.

The artistic licenses included telescoping three years of scandal into one, changing the location of Van Doren's first meeting with Goodwin (it was at NBC in real life), altering the start time of Goodwin's investigation (in reality, it was after Van Doren's last game), and making Van Doren's choice of mis-answering a question his own instead of NBC's. "A protracted dance of denial and disclosure is transformed into a fast-paced detective story," categorized Tom Dunkel.

The film's magnification of the role Twenty-One and its producer, Albert Freedman, had in the scandal was criticized by Jeff Kisslehoff, who wrote The Box: An Oral History of Television, 1920-1961, and the real-life Freedman; Kisslehoff reasoned that the cheating of contestants on 1950s game shows was brought from the radio era where players were overtly coached. Goodwin also had a lesser importance in the investigation than portrayed in the film; he was involved two years after Twenty-One ended syndication, and put the pieces together, whereas collection of information was handled by publications and assistant district attorneys in New York City. Joe Stone, a congressional committee consultant who investigated the scandal for four years, was angered not only by the screenplay's spotlight on Goodwin but also that, as of the film's release, he took most of the credit for uncovering the scandal; Goodwin's wife, Doris Kearns Goodwin, apologized to Stone about the film via telephone.

For legal reasons, alterations had to be made to Matthew Rosenhaus, the CEO of the company that owned Geritol, J.B. Williams Co.; his name was changed to Martin Rittenhome, and his personality reflected that of Charles Revson, who was the president of cosmetics brand Revlon that sponsored another quiz show that was a part of the scandal, The $64,000 Question (1955–1958). While Stempel's wife Toby is unaware of the hackery behind Twenty-One in the film, she and her family knew about it in reality and told him to "take the money and run."

Some dramatic liberties involved simplifications, such as with the character of Charles Van Doren, who is a "shallow icon" devoid of the ambiguities his real-world counterpart had, Chicago Reader analyzed. In a July 2008 edition of The New Yorker, Van Doren wrote about the events depicted in the film. He agreed with many of the details. But he also said that he had a regular girlfriend (his future wife) at the time he was on Twenty-One, and that she was not present in the film depiction. Van Doren also noted that he continued teaching, contrary to the film's epilogue which stated he never returned to doing so.

Production

Background 
When Robert Redford first saw Twenty-One in the late 1950s, he was in his early 20s taking art and acting classes in New York City, the same city in which Rockefeller Center, the show's studio, was located. He recalled when he first saw Charles Van Doren on the show, "Watching him and the other contestants was irresistible. The actor in me looked at the show and felt I was watching other actors. It was too much to believe, but at the same time, I never doubted the show. I hadn't had evidence television could trick us. But the merchant mentality was already taking hold, and as we know now, there's little morality there." The filmmaker described the scandal as "really the first in a series of scandals . . . that have left us numbed, unsure of what or who to believe."

There had already been a documentary on the scandal, the Julian Krainin-produced work for a 1992 installment of the PBS series The American Experience.

Writing 
Quiz Show is based on a chapter of the book Remembering America: A Voice From the Sixties (1988) by Richard N. Goodwin, who also was one of the film's many producers. Paul Attanasio began writing the screenplay in 1990, who joined immediately for the subject matter's "complex ironies," such as with its main characters. Going through over a dozen drafts over the course of three years, Attanasio wrote the script by watching clips of Twenty-One, reading old publication articles about the scandal and its people, getting a sense of the 1950s television landscape at the Museum of Broadcasting, and having meetings with Goodwin. Redford researched the topic himself by reading Dan Wakefield's book New York in the Fifties, and had the author be on set to ask him questions and give him a cameo appearance. Redford personally knew Goodwin since acting in The Candidate (1972), and helped Attanasio integrate the investigator's real-life personality.

Because the story lacked a protagonist, Attanasio had to work with using a novel-based technique of "shifting points of view" while keeping a through line usual for films, which made writing the screenplay difficult. In depicting the themes of ethnic conflict between White Anglo-Saxon Protestants and Jewish characters, Attanasio borrowed from his experiences of being raised in a family with an Italian background; his relatives were outraged by the stereotypical depiction of Italians as loudmouth gangsters in the media, and, like other Bronx Italians, held negative viewpoints towards Brooklyn Italians. He also used the personality of those he worked with in the film industry, "killers" hiding behind nice attitudes, for incorporating themes of disillusion.

Development 
Redford first read a rough draft after completing production of A River Runs Through It (1992), "looking for something edgier, faster-paced, urban, where I could move the camera more." Barry Levinson's Baltimore Pictures and TriStar Pictures began development of a film project based on the quiz show scandal, which was tough to sell due to its non-commercial style and subject matter; TriStar placed it in turnaround in September 1992, only for it to be moved to Disney. They backed $20 million into the budget and launched it into production in spring 1993 after Redford, whose most recent success was A River Runs Through It, came on board as director. Although Disney offered Charles Van Doren $100,000 to be a consultant on the film, he declined.

Casting 
Casting took place in New York in May 1993. He originally planned an American actor to play Charles Van Doren, but after auditioning several, including William Baldwin, he couldn't find the "combination of elements" required for the character in any of them and went with the British Ralph Fiennes. For the role, Fiennes not only viewed clips of Van Doren on Twenty-One as well as interviews with him, he also went to the real-life Van Doren's Cornwall, Connecticut home; although there never was a full meeting between the two, Fiennes did get a sense of atmosphere of Van Doren's home as well as asked him directions from a distance to get an idea for his voice. An American actor, Paul Newman, was also initially considered for Mark Van Doren, but he declined. Chris O'Donnell was reported in a May 1993 Variety article having talks with Redford about appearing in Quiz Show, although he ultimately wasn't cast.

Turturro, who himself had felt like an outsider, had an easy time getting into the character of a Jewish outcast like Stempel; however, he still altered himself to fit the character, gaining 25 pounds and training to mimic Stempel's high-pitched voice. After breaking through by playing the top-billed role in Northern Exposure (1990–1995), Morrow was offered several film roles but rejected all of them in looking for the right one to play; this was until he accepted the offer for Quiz Show: "I knew this was the one. It had the cachet of Bob Redford and was incredibly well-written." In getting the idea of the character of Goodwin, Morrow read four of his books.

Levinson was originally attached to the project as director, but because he had to film Bugsy (1991), his position was replaced by Redford. However, Levinson was then cast by Redford for the part of Dave Garroway, as Redford liked his "easygoing, casual manner" and interest in 1950s culture. For the scene involving J. Fred Muggs, they had to use a chimp "unnerved by the lights and cameras" as no creatures trained for film production were available. Martin Scorsese was cast by Redford not only for his physical features, but also for "his own personal style and delivery, so I found it interesting to have him play a tough character gently. And given his delivery style, in which he talks real fast, I thought it would make the character extremely menacing."

Themes 
Quiz Show is a Faustian tale about the loss of innocence (both for its three main characters and the entire country), temptation with money, moral ambiguity, positive guises hiding otherwise bad-faith actions, the cult of celebrity, the negative side effects of fame, the power and corruption of big business and mass media, the consequences of over-competitiveness in business, racial, ethnic, and class conflict, and the discord between education and entertainment. Attanasio, Redford, and most film critics considered Quiz Shows subject matter to be essential, as it marked the beginning of the country's loss of innocence and faith in its trusted institutions that was exacerbated by events like the Vietnam War, the Watergate scandal, and more.

Reviews from TV Guide and Newsweek noted that in the era of the film's release, scandals and culturally-unacceptable behaviors were more expected and less shocking to the American public than they were in the 1950s, when the long-time myth of American innocence dominated the nation; it was to the point where controversial figures were even rewarded, as Newsweek claimed: "Neck high in '90s cynicism, it's hard to believe the tremors these scandals provoked. [...] In the '50s, Ingrid Bergman was blacklisted from Hollywood for having a baby out of wedlock. Today, Oliver North makes hash of the Constitution and it jump-starts his political career. What used to ruin your life gets you invited on "Oprah" and a fat book deal. Shame is for losers; public confession and a 12-step program can turn you into a role model."

Release 
Although Quiz Show was ultimately released in September 1994, reports from late 1993 indicated that the film was originally planned to be distributed sometime in the year's first half.

With Quiz Show, Buena Vista Pictures took on a platform release strategy where it garnered buzz by being released in a limited number of theaters before opening wider; one other film released that same non-competitive fall, The Shawshank Redemption (1994), was distributed in a similar manner, and both it and Quiz Show were box office failures. It opened in New York City on September 14, 1994, and expanded to 27 screens for the weekend, grossing $757,714, the fifth-highest-grossing opening weekend on under 50 screens of all time. It grossed $792,366 in its first 5 days. The film gradually expanded over the next four weeks to a maximum of 822 screens and grossed a total of $24,822,619 in the United States and Canada. 8 million (US/Canada) In the United States, the film continued to drop in performance even after its Academy Award nominations, where it fell 63% in weekly grosses for the week of March 12, 1995.

Following its theatrical run, Quiz Show ran out-of-competition at international festivals, such as the 1995 Berlin International Film Festival and that same year's China edition of the Sundance Film Festival, which ran from October 5 to 12, 1995. Five weeks prior to the Berlin festival, Redford told Buena Vista he couldn't attend, which was due to the filming of Up Close and Personal (1996) and going to the 1995 Sundance Film Festival filling up his schedule; however, according to festival director Moritz de Hadeln, Berlin nonetheless made a deal with the distributor to promote Quiz Show with the requirement that Redford be present. His non-attendance resulted in erosion of his relationship with Buena Vista and other film festival organizers, as well as less promotion for the film's international release.

In countries internationally, such as in Germany and France, Quiz Show generally performed far better in big cities than in smaller towns and had more female attendees than male. In Italy, despite much press and interest in the film's subject matter, it wasn't a commercial success due to motion pictures with even a hint of a negative tone generally not appealing to the country's audiences. The best international performance was in Spain, where it grossed $368,000 within six days of a 31-screen run. The film grossed an international total of $1.4 million by February 12, 1995, more than a month before the Oscar ceremony. It finally grossed $27.4 million internationally for a worldwide total of $52.2 million.

Critical reception 
Quiz Show currently holds a 97% rating on Rotten Tomatoes based on 56 reviews, with an average rating of 8.2/10. The site's consensus states: "Robert Redford refracts the sociopolitical and moral issues posed by the subject material through a purely entertaining, well-acted lens." Film critic Roger Ebert gave the film 3½ stars out of four, calling the screenplay "smart, subtle and ruthless." Web critic James Berardinelli praised the "superb performances by Fiennes", and said "John Turturro is exceptional as the uncharismatic Herbie Stempel." Writing for Entertainment Weekly, Owen Gleiberman highlighted the supporting performance of Paul Scofield as Mark Van Doren, stating that "it's in the relationship between the two Van Dorens that Quiz Show finds its soul."

Kenneth Turan called Scofield's performance his best since A Man for All Seasons (1966), and suggested the film "would have been a very different experience" without Fiennes' "ability to project the pain behind a well-mannered facade, to turn intellectual and emotional agony into a real and living thing. However, he also was a bit more critical towards the exaggerated performances of Turturro and Morrow.

Charles Van Doren said, "I understand that movies need to compress and conflate, but what bothered me most was the epilogue stating that I never taught again. I didn't stop teaching, although it was a long time before I taught again in a college. I did enjoy John Turturro's version of Stempel. And I couldn't help but laugh when Stempel referred to me in the film as 'Charles Van Fucking Moron.'"

Year-end lists 

 1st – Joan Vadeboncoeur, Syracuse Herald American
 1st – John Hurley, Staten Island Advance
 2nd – Peter Travers, Rolling Stone
 2nd – Sean P. Means, The Salt Lake Tribune
 2nd – Craig Kopp, The Cincinnati Post
 2nd – Terry Lawson, Dayton Daily News
 2nd – Robert Denerstein, Rocky Mountain News
 2nd – Scott Schuldt, The Oklahoman
 2nd – National Board of Review
 3rd – Kenneth Turan, Los Angeles Times
 3rd – Janet Maslin, The New York Times
 3rd – Desson Howe, The Washington Post
 3rd – Stephen Hunter, The Baltimore Sun
 3rd – David Stupich, The Milwaukee Journal
 3rd – Michael Mills, The Palm Beach Post
 3rd – Sandi Davis, The Oklahoman
 3rd – Mal Vincent, The Virginian-Pilot
 4th – Steve Persall, St. Petersburg Times
 4th – Christopher Sheid, The Munster Times
 5th – Gene Siskel, Chicago Tribune
 6th – Michael MacCambridge, Austin American-Statesman
 7th – Bob Strauss, Los Angeles Daily News
 7th – Douglas Armstrong, The Milwaukee Journal
 7th – Jerry Roberts, Daily Breeze
 8th – David Rahr, The Santa Fe New Mexican
 9th – Mack Bates, The Milwaukee Journal
 10th – Roger Ebert, Chicago Sun-Times
 10th – James Berardinelli, ReelViews
 Top 7 (not ranked) – Duane Dudek, Milwaukee Sentinel
 Top 9 (not ranked) – Dan Webster, The Spokesman-Review
 Top 10 (listed alphabetically, not ranked) – Mike Clark, USA Today
 Top 10 (listed alphabetically, not ranked) – William Arnold, Seattle Post-Intelligencer
 Top 10 (listed alphabetically, not ranked) – Matt Zoller Seitz, Dallas Observer
 Top 10 (listed alphabetically, not ranked) – Eleanor Ringel, The Atlanta Journal-Constitution
 Top 10 (listed alphabetically, not ranked) – Steve Murray, The Atlanta Journal-Constitution
 Top 10 (listed alphabetically, not ranked) – Jeff Simon, The Buffalo News
 Top 10 (listed alphabetically, not ranked) – Bob Ross, The Tampa Tribune
 Top 10 (listed alphabetically, not ranked) – Eric Harrison, Arkansas Democrat-Gazette
 Top 10 (listed alphabetically, not ranked) – Mike Mayo, The Roanoke Times
 Top 10 (not ranked) – Betsy Pickle, Knoxville News-Sentinel
 Top 10 (not ranked) – Bob Carlton, The Birmingham News
 Top 10 (not ranked) – Jim Delmont and Jim Minge, Omaha World-Herald
 Top 10 (not ranked) – Howie Movshovitz, The Denver Post
 Top 10 (not ranked) – George Meyer, The Ledger
 "Next Best" 10 (not ranked) – Gary Arnold, The Washington Times
 Top 10 Runner-up – Dan Craft, The Pantagraph
 Honorable mention – Glenn Lovell, San Jose Mercury News
 Honorable mention – Dennis King, Tulsa World
 Honorable mention – David Elliott, The San Diego Union-Tribune

Accolades 

Paul Scofield was also nominated for the Dallas–Fort Worth Film Critics Association Award for Best Supporting Actor, the National Society of Film Critics Award for Best Supporting Actor, and the New York Film Critics Circle Award for Best Supporting Actor.

John Turturro was also nominated for the Chicago Film Critics Association Award for Best Supporting Actor.

References

Citations

Videos

External links

 
 
 
 

1994 films
1994 drama films
1990s American films
1990s English-language films
American detective films
American docudrama films
American drama films
American films based on actual events
American historical drama films
American legal drama films
American mystery drama films
BAFTA winners (films)
Entertainment scandals
Films about games
Films about television
Films directed by Robert Redford
Films produced by Michael Nozik
Films scored by Mark Isham
Films set in 1958
Films set in Connecticut
Films set in New York City
Films set in Washington, D.C.
Films shot in New Jersey
Films whose writer won the Best Adapted Screenplay BAFTA Award
Films with screenplays by Paul Attanasio
Hollywood Pictures films
Films about quizzes and game shows